"3-Minute Rule" is the 7th track on the album Paul's Boutique by American hip hop group the Beastie Boys, released on July 25, 1989. The track was produced and written by the Beastie Boys & the Dust Brothers, and engineered by Mario Caldato & Allen Abrahamson.

Content 
Despite its title, the song is actually 3 minutes 39 seconds. It begins with the sound of what is apparently a ping-pong ball being hit back and forth. Then Mike D raps from about the 0:12 mark to around the 1:12 mark. MCA follows from about 1:14 to 2:00. Finally, Ad-Rock takes over from around 2:09 and continues to 3:07, followed by another half minute of music.

The track contains samples of "Feel Good" by Fancy and "Brave and Strong" by Sly & the Family Stone.

Incidentally, it is one of the few Beastie Boys tracks where each member has a standalone verse.

References

Beastie Boys songs
1989 songs
Songs written by Ad-Rock
Songs about cannabis
Songs written by Mike D
Songs written by Adam Yauch
Song recordings produced by Dust Brothers